Hemiphyllodactylus zalonicus, also known as the Mt. Zalon slender gecko, is a species of gecko. It is endemic to Myanmar.

References

Hemiphyllodactylus
Reptiles described in 2021
Endemic fauna of Myanmar
Reptiles of Myanmar
Taxa named by Larry Lee Grismer
Taxa named by Roman A. Nazarov
Taxa named by Nikolay A. Poyarkov Jr.